John Lumpkin may refer to:
 John Henry Lumpkin, U.S. Representative from Georgia
 John Lumpkin (coach), American college football coach and Mississippi politician